The Porsche 914/6 GT was a race car built by Porsche, based on the 914 model with a 6-cylinder engine and GT package.

History

The 914/6 GT was a race configured version of the 914/6. The factory offered the GT option, which was distinguishable by its box-like steel fender flares. It quickly became known as the 914/6 GT and was raced employing different engine configurations. This included the 'T' specification, which was a basic 911 engine. Another popular configuration was to use a converted Carrera 6 engine.

In 1970, Porsche entered a 914/6 with the factory's GT option in the grueling 24 Hours of Le Mans race. The car, identified as #40, was driven by Claude Ballot-Léna and Guy Chasseuil. It finished sixth overall, preceded only by prototype racecars like the V12 Ferrari 512S and Flat-12 Porsche 917K. In addition, the #40 won its class ahead of several Porsche 911S entries. 914/6s also competed in some of the most important race competitions of its era, e.g. Targa Florio with Brian Redman, Monte Carlo Rally and Daytona International Speedway. Walt Maas successfully campaigned a 914/6 "GT" in the IMSA race series.

The Porsche 914/6 was introduced in September 1969 and was a collaborative effort between Porsche and Volkswagen. Short lived, only 3360 examples were produced between 1970 and 1972. Sitting very low, the 914/6's suspension is a combination of a 911-type torsion bar front suspension with a rear coil spring suspension. It also features Porsche disc brakes. The headlights hide in the hood and pop-up when needed. Its targa top can be stored in the rear trunk. The 914/6 received the ram-tuned Weber carbureted 2.0-litre flat six 110 hp Porsche engine that had been previously used with the basic 1969 911T. Weighing just under , the 914/6 proved to be considerably faster. A five-speed manual gearbox was standard equipment on all models.

In 2020, a 914/6 GT was sold for $995,000 at the Gooding & Company auction in Scottsdale, Arizona, the most valuable 914 ever sold.

References 

Coupés
Rear mid-engine, rear-wheel-drive vehicles
914-6 GT
Volkswagen vehicles
Roadsters
1960s cars
1970s cars
24 Hours of Le Mans race cars
914-6 GT
Cars powered by boxer engines